Kieran Dover (born 25 November 1996) is an English-born Australian semi-professional soccer player who plays as a midfielder for Bentleigh Greens in the National Premier Leagues Victoria.

Career

Early career
From Stockton-on-Tees, Dover started his career at the youth team of Sunderland before moving to Australia at the age of twelve, where he joined the youth ranks at Berwick City. He then eventually went on to join Dandenong Thunder of the NPL Victoria where he was named Winning Edge Presentations Rising Star of the Month in August. He also played for the Melbourne Victory youth sides in the A-League National Youth League.

Melbourne Victory
On 15 November 2014, following injuries and international call-ups for many players in the senior squad, Dover made his professional debut for Melbourne Victory against Sydney FC, coming on as a substitute.

Bentleigh Greens
On 19 May 2016, it was announced that Dover had signed with Bentleigh Greens SC of the National Premier Leagues Victoria.

Personal life
Dover moved to Australia in 2010 aged twelve after his father Sean accepted a job with construction company Grocon, where he was involved in the construction of Victory's stadium, AAMI Park.

Career statistics

References

1996 births
Living people
Footballers from Stockton-on-Tees
English footballers
English emigrants to Australia
Australian soccer players
Association football midfielders
A-League Men players
Melbourne Victory FC players
Bentleigh Greens SC players
National Premier Leagues players